Hire is a surname. Notable people with the name include:

Greg Hire (born 1987), Australian basketball player
Kathryn P. Hire (born 1959), American astronaut
Lois Hire (1916–2006), American television writer

See also
Hires (surname)